The 2021–22 EuroCup Women was the twentieth edition of FIBA Europe's second-tier international competition for women's basketball clubs under such name.

Teams

Schedule

Draw
The draw will take place in Freising, Germany at 11:00 CET of August 19, 2021.

Draw rules are as follows.

Divided into two geographical conferences, a total of 61 clubs participate.

26 teams enter the competition in the Qualifiers stage and four teams move down from the EuroLeague Women Qualifiers.

The seedings are based on the ranking of the club performances in the European Club Competitions in the last three seasons.

Qualification round

Conference 1

|}

Conference 2

|}

Regular season

Conference 1

Group A

Group B

Group C

Group D

Group E

Group F

Conference 2

Group G

Group H

Group I

Group J

Group K

Group L

Ranking of third-placed teams

Conference 1

Conference 2

Seeding

Play-off Round 1

|}

Round of 16

|}

Round of 8

|}

Quarterfinals

|}

Final Four

Semifinals

|}

Third place game

|}

Final

|}

See also
 2021–22 EuroLeague Women

External links
 EuroCup Women website

References

EuroCup Women seasons
2021–22 in European women's basketball leagues